Kelzar Dam, is an earthfill dam on Aram river near Satana, Nashik district in the state of Maharashtra in India.

Specifications

Purpose
 Irrigation

See also
 Dams in Maharashtra
 List of reservoirs and dams in India

References

Dams in Nashik district
Dams completed in 1981
1981 establishments in Maharashtra